John Christian Mundt (born November 23, 1994) is an American football tight end for the Minnesota Vikings of the National Football League (NFL). He played college football at Oregon.

Professional career

Los Angeles Rams

Mundt signed with the Los Angeles Rams as an undrafted free agent on April 29, 2017. Mundt had a solid preseason competing with fellow rookie Travis Wilson for the team's possible third tight end spot behind Tyler Higbee and Gerald Everett. He was waived by the Rams on September 3, 2017 and was re-signed to the practice squad. He was promoted to the active roster on November 11, 2017. He was waived by the Rams on November 21, 2017 and was re-signed to the practice squad. He signed a reserve/future contract with the Rams on January 8, 2018.

Mundt re-signed on a one-year exclusive-rights free agent contract with the Rams on April 17, 2020. He signed another one-year contract on March 18, 2021. He suffered a torn ACL in Week 6 and was placed on injured reserve on October 19, 2021. Without Mundt, the Rams won Super Bowl LVI against the Cincinnati Bengals.

Minnesota Vikings
On March 16, 2022, Mundt signed a two-year contract with the Minnesota Vikings.

References

External links
Los Angeles Rams bio
Oregon Ducks bio

1994 births
Living people
American football tight ends
Players of American football from California
Sportspeople from Modesto, California
Oregon Ducks football players
Los Angeles Rams players
Minnesota Vikings players